Aeneas Mackintosh (1927–1998) was a 20th-century clergyman of the Scottish Episcopal Church.

Education and family 
Born Inverness, he was educated at Kelham Theological College in Nottinghamshire, 1944–45 and 1948–52. He was ordained as a deacon in 1952 and a priest in 1953. In 1956, he married his wife Eileen Mary Barlow, and they had four sons: Richard, Mark, Simon and Christopher.

Ministry positions 
 Precentor at St Andrew's Cathedral, Inverness, 1952–55.
 Curate at St Augustine's Church, Wisbech, Cambridgeshire, 1955–57.
 Curate-in-charge at St Matthew's, Glasgow, 1957–60, and then Rector, 1960–61.
 Rector of Haddington, East Lothian, 1961–65.
 Diocesan Inspector of Schools for the Diocese of Edinburgh, 1963–81.
 Assistant priest at St John's, Edinburgh, 1965–69, and then Rector, 1969–81.
 Senior Tutor, Diocese of Edinburgh Training for Ministry (T.F.M.), 1972–87. 
 Canon of St Mary's Cathedral, Edinburgh, 1975.
 Rector of North Berwick and Gullane, 1981–87.
 Provincial Information Officer and Communication Advisor, 1987–92.

He retired in June 1992 and died on 8 December 1998.

Notes

References

External links 
 Rev Aeneas Mackintosh (Herald Scotland)

1927 births
1998 deaths
20th-century Scottish Episcopalian priests
Alumni of Kelham Theological College